Diana Cooper may refer to:

 Lady Diana Cooper (1892–1986), British actress and socialite
 Diana Cooper (artist) (born 1964), American artist